Soif (lit. "Thirsty") is a Canadian animated short film, directed by Michèle Cournoyer and released in 2014. The film depicts a woman's struggle with alcoholism.

The film was a Canadian Screen Award nominee for Best Animated Short Film at the 3rd Canadian Screen Awards, and a Jutra Award nominee for Best Animated Short Film at the 17th Jutra Awards.

References

External links

2014 films
2014 animated films
2014 short films
Canadian animated short films
National Film Board of Canada animated short films
2010s Canadian films